Sadabad, Iran is a city in Bushehr Province, Iran.

Sadabad in Iran may also refer to:

Bushehr Province
Sadabad, Iran, a city
Sadabad District, in Bushehr Province

East Azerbaijan Province
Sadabad, East Azerbaijan, a village in Bostanabad County

Fars Province
Sadabad-e Davan, a village in Kazerun County
Sadabad, Lamerd, a village in Lamerd County

Golestan Province
Sadabad, Golestan
Sadabad-e Fenderesk, Golestan Province

Ilam Province
Sadabad, Ilam

Isfahan Province
Sadabad, Nain, a village in Nain County

Kerman Province
Sadabad, Anbarabad, a village in Anbarabad County
Sadabad, Bam, a village in Bam County
Sadabad, Kerman, a village in Kerman County
Sadabad, Rigan, a village in Rigan County

Kurdistan Province
Sadabad, Bijar, a village in Bijar County
Sadabad, Marivan, a village in Marivan County

Markazi Province
Sadabad, Markazi

Qom Province
Sadabad, Qom

Razavi Khorasan Province
Sadabad, Dargaz, Razavi Khorasan Province
Sadabad, Fariman, Razavi Khorasan Province
Sadabad, Nishapur, Razavi Khorasan Province
Sadabad, Rashtkhvar, Razavi Khorasan Province
Sadabad, Zaveh, Razavi Khorasan Province
Sadabad-e Arab, Razavi Khorasan Province

Semnan Province
Sadabad, Garmsar, in Garmsar County
Sadabad, Shahrud, in Shahrud County

Tehran Province
Sadabad-e Amlak, in Tehran Province
Saidabad, Pishva, in Tehran Province
Sa'dabad Palace, Tehran, Iran

Yazd Province
Sadabad, Yazd, a village in Taft County

Zanjan Province
Sadabad, Zanjan, a village in Khodabandeh County